María Isabel Fernández Gutiérrez (born 1 February 1972) is a Spanish judoka. She is an Olympic champion, a world champion and six-time European champion. She won a gold medal in the lightweight (57 kg) division at the 2000 Summer Olympics in Sydney, and received an Olympic bronze medal in 1996.

References

External links
 

1972 births
People from Baix Vinalopó
Sportspeople from the Province of Alicante
Living people
Olympic judoka of Spain
Judoka at the 1996 Summer Olympics
Judoka at the 2000 Summer Olympics
Judoka at the 2008 Summer Olympics
Olympic gold medalists for Spain
Olympic bronze medalists for Spain
Olympic medalists in judo
Spanish female judoka
Medalists at the 2000 Summer Olympics
Medalists at the 1996 Summer Olympics
Mediterranean Games gold medalists for Spain
Mediterranean Games medalists in judo
Competitors at the 2005 Mediterranean Games
20th-century Spanish women